Endlessly  may refer to:

Albums
Endlessly (album) or the title song, by Duffy, 2010
Endlessly, or the title song (see below), by Brook Benton, 1959
Endlessly, or the title song, by Lin Yu-chun, 2011

Songs
"Endlessly" (song), by Brook Benton, 1959; covered by Sonny James (1970)
"Endlessly", by Anna Timofei competing to represent Moldova in the Eurovision Song Contest 2018
"Endlessly", by b4-4 from b4-4, 2000
"Endlessly", by Baboon from We Sing and Play, 1999
"Endlessly", by The Cab from Symphony Soldier, 2011
"Endlessly", by Dino from The Way I Am, 1993
"Endlessly", by Green River Ordinance from Fifteen, 2016
"Endlessly", by Joe Lynn Turner from Rescue You, 1985
"Endlessly", by John Foxx from The Golden Section, 1983
"Endlessly", by Ludwig Galea
"Endlessly", by Muse from Absolution, 2003
"Endlessly", by Neil Sedaka, a B-side of the single "Laughter in the Rain", 1974
"Endlessly", by Nothing from Guilty of Everything, 2014
"Endlessly", by Sennek, 2019
"Endlessly", composed by Walter Kent, 1945

See also 
Endless (disambiguation)